The enzyme phosphatidylinositol diacylglycerol-lyase (EC 4.6.1.13) catalyzes the following reaction: 

1-phosphatidyl-1D-myo-inositol = 1D-myo-inositol 1,2-cyclic phosphate + 1,2-diacyl-sn-glycerol

This enzyme belongs to the family of lyases, specifically the class of phosphorus-oxygen lyases.  The systematic name of this enzyme class is 1-phosphatidyl-1D-myo-inositol 1,2-diacyl-sn-glycerol-lyase (1D-myo-inositol-1,2-cyclic-phosphate-forming). Other names in common use include monophosphatidylinositol phosphodiesterase, phosphatidylinositol phospholipase C, 1-phosphatidylinositol phosphodiesterase, 1-phosphatidyl-D-myo-inositol inositolphosphohydrolase, (cyclic-phosphate-forming), 1-phosphatidyl-1D-myo-inositol diacylglycerol-lyase, and (1,2-cyclic-phosphate-forming).  It participates in inositol phosphate metabolism.

Structural studies

References

 
 
 
 
 
 

EC 4.6.1
Enzymes of known structure